Hezakiah Oshutapik (sometimes spelt as Hezekiah, 1955 or 1956 – April 17, 2020) was a Canadian politician, who was elected to represent the district of Pangnirtung in the Legislative Assembly of Nunavut in a by-election on September 12, 2011.

Oshutapik previously served as mayor of Pangnirtung. He died on April 17, 2020 at the age of 63, from a heart attack.

References

1950s births
2020 deaths
Members of the Legislative Assembly of Nunavut
21st-century Canadian politicians
Inuit from the Northwest Territories
Inuit politicians
People from Pangnirtung
Mayors of places in Nunavut
Inuit from Nunavut
Year of birth missing